R P S Inter College is a senior secondary school in Kanpur Dehat district, Uttar Pradesh, India. The school is affiliated to U P Madhyamik Shiksha Parishad Allahabad. It is a government aided institution.
This school was first school in the district Kanpur where Agriculture faculty introduced at intermediate classes in 1950.

Location
The distance of this school from Kanpur city is 44 kilometers west and 14 kilometers from Akbarpur in the Kanpur Dehat district toward north-west.
The school is situated near a bi-weekly vegetable market on the north side of the town and one kilometer from the Rura (North Central Railway ) railway station. Lower Ganga Canal flows on the north side of this school.

Founder
Babu Ram Prasad Shukla(Born-----,Death July 1953) was a landlord and the richest person in Rura. He founded this inter college in 1947 on the day of the festival of  "Karva Chauth or Kark Chaturthi," and gave it the name Ram Prasad Sarvjanik Inter College. He donated all of his property (movable and immovable) to the school and to the Pandit Kalika Prasad Trust. He received recognition for the school at a time for faculties i.e.: humanities, science, commerce and agriculture in 1950.

Head Masters
(for UPS) (Unrecognized)
Harishchandra Singh Gaharwar(4 November 1947 - December 1948) (Off.) 
(for High School)
Ganga Charan Agnihotri (January 1949 - June 1950)

List of Principals
(Senior Secondary School)
Ganga Charan Agnihotri ( July 1950 - June 1957)
Raj Bahadur Awasthi   (July 1957 - December 1966)
Anand Prakash Agnihotri (Jan.1967 - June 1968) (Off.)
Ravi Shankar Sharma (July 1968 - June 1970)    (Off.)
Naval Kishor Awasthi (July 1970 - December 1970)   (Off.)
Raj Bahadur Awasthi   (Jan.1971 - June 1971)
Jagdish Narayan Tiwari (July 1971 - June 1987)
Bans Lal Singh Sengar  (July 1987 - September 1988) (Off.)
Ram Kumar Sachan   (Oct. 1988 -  January 1990)    (Off.)
Shiv Kumar Bajpai  (Feb. 1990 - June 1991)     (Off.)
Bansh Lal Singh Sengar(July 1991 - June 2001)
Udaybhanu Singh Gaur (July 2001 - June 2002)   (Off.)
Shankar Singh Gaur   (July 2002 - June 2006)   (Off.)
Brijendra Singh Sengar (2006–present)

Faculties
Humanities 
Science
commerce
Agriculture

Facilities
Playground, library, NCC (National Cadet Corp) company, science laboratories (physics, chemistry and biology). A large agriculture farm for practical work of agriculture students.

Gallery

References

Intermediate colleges in Uttar Pradesh
High schools and secondary schools in Uttar Pradesh
Education in Kanpur Dehat district
1947 establishments in India